The Journey...So Far is the debut album of metalcore band, Society's Finest. This is the only production to feature any of the original members, other than vocalist Josh Ashworth.

Critical reception
Chris Gramlich of Exclaim! writes  "Still, while The Journey So Far is an adequate starting point for this quintet, whose roster includes former Embodyment screamer Josh Ashworth, their next musical endeavour must take them farther than The Journey... if they wish to rise above second tier status. (Solid State)"

Artwork
The cover art, according to Jarrod Norris of Deadself Records, the picture was him, with a paper bag on his head, guitarist Kris McCaddon took the picture at Bassist Joel Bailey's house.

Track listing

Personnel
Society's Finest
 Joel Bailey – bass, vocals
 Rob Pruett – guitar, vocals
 Joshua Ashworth – vocals
 Kris McCaddon – guitar
 Chad Wilburn – drums

Additional musicians
 Josh Burnett – drums

Production
 Ramón Bretón – mastering
 Brandon Ebel – executive producer
 Jason Magnusson – assistant engineer
 Barry Poynter – engineer, mixing, producer
 Jarrod Norris – model

References

Solid State Records albums
Society's Finest albums
2000 albums